The Olden Days Coat is a Canadian television film, directed by Bruce Pittman and broadcast by CBC Television in 1981. A Christmas-themed family film adapted from a short story by Margaret Laurence, it stars Megan Follows as Sal, a young girl who is upset that the recent death of her grandfather has prevented her family from celebrating Christmas normally, but who learns the true meaning of the season after she finds an old coat belonging to her grandmother (Doris Petrie) which transports her back in time when she puts it on.

It was the first television production by Atlantis Communications, which would go on to become one of the major Canadian film studios.

The film had selected film festival screenings prior to its television debut on December 21, 1981. It won the Bijou Award for Best Television Drama Under 30 Minutes, and was an ACTRA Award nominee for Best Children's Television Program at the 11th ACTRA Awards in 1982.

See also
 List of Christmas films

References

External links

1981 television films
1981 films
1980s Christmas drama films
Canadian Christmas drama films
CBC Television original films
Alliance Atlantis films
Films based on works by Margaret Laurence
Christmas television films
English-language Canadian films
Canadian drama television films
Films directed by Bruce Pittman
1980s Canadian films